is a Japanese voice actress affiliated with I'm Enterprise.

Biography
She made her debut role for ef: a tale of memories and had a leading role for the anime series Battle Spirits: Shounen Toppa Bashin. In August 2015, Tamura underwent surgery to remove a polyp from her throat. She wrote in her blog that she would return to acting on September 1 and explained her health problem in a radio on September 8.

Filmography

Anime series

Original net animation

Original video animation

Anime films

Video games

Dubbing

Live-action

Animation

References

External links
Official agency profile 

1987 births
Living people
I'm Enterprise voice actors
Japanese video game actresses
Japanese voice actresses
Voice actresses from Aomori Prefecture
Voice actresses from Tokyo
21st-century Japanese actresses